Villa Serrana is a tourist location in Lavalleja Department, Uruguay. It is located 25 km northeast of Minas.

It was established in 1946 according to plans by architect Julio Vilamajó, being his last significant work; the young architect Miguel Ángel Odriozola was an important collaborator.

Nowadays it has fewer than 100 people living there permanently.

References

External links
 VillaSerrana.info
 History of Villa Serrana

Populated places established in 1946
1946 establishments in Uruguay
Populated places in the Lavalleja Department
Tourist attractions in Uruguay